Proof by exhaustion, also known as proof by cases, proof by case analysis, complete induction or the brute force method, is a method of mathematical proof in which the statement to be proved is split into a finite number of cases or sets of equivalent cases, and where each type of case is checked to see if the proposition in question holds. This is a method of direct proof. A proof by exhaustion typically contains two stages:

 A proof that the set of cases is exhaustive; i.e., that each instance of the statement to be proved matches the conditions of (at least) one of the cases.
 A proof of each of the cases.

The prevalence of digital computers has greatly increased the convenience of using the method of exhaustion (e.g., the first computer-assisted proof of four color theorem in 1976), though such approaches can also be challenged on the basis of mathematical elegance. Expert systems can be used to arrive at answers to many of the questions posed to them. In theory, the proof by exhaustion method can be used whenever the number of cases is finite. However, because most mathematical sets are infinite, this method is rarely used to derive general mathematical results.

In the Curry–Howard isomorphism, proof by exhaustion and case analysis are related to ML-style pattern matching.

Example
Proof by exhaustion can be used to prove that if an integer is a perfect cube, then it must be either a multiple of 9, 1 more than a multiple of 9, or 1 less than a multiple of 9.

Proof:
Each perfect cube is the cube of some integer n, where n is either a multiple of 3, 1 more than a multiple of 3, or 1 less than a multiple of 3. So these three cases are exhaustive:
Case 1: If n = 3p, then n3 = 27p3, which is a multiple of 9.
Case 2: If n = 3p + 1, then n3 = 27p3 + 27p2 + 9p + 1, which is 1 more than a multiple of 9. For instance, if n = 4 then n3 = 64 = 9×7 + 1.
Case 3: If n = 3p − 1, then n3 = 27p3 − 27p2 + 9p − 1, which is 1 less than a multiple of 9. For instance, if n = 5 then n3 = 125 = 9×14 − 1. Q.E.D.

Elegance
Mathematicians prefer to avoid proofs by exhaustion with large numbers of cases, which are viewed as inelegant. An illustration as to how such proofs might be inelegant is to look at the following proofs that all modern Summer Olympic Games are held in years which are divisible by 4:

Proof: The first modern Summer Olympics were held in 1896, and then every 4 years thereafter (neglecting exceptions such as when the games were not held due to World War I and World War II along with the 2020 Tokyo Olympics being postponed to 2021 due to the COVID-19 pandemic.). Since 1896 = 474 × 4 is divisible by 4, the next Olympics would be in year 474 × 4 + 4 = (474 + 1) × 4, which is also divisible by four, and so on (this is a proof by mathematical induction). Therefore the statement is proved.

The statement can also be proved by exhaustion by listing out every year in which the Summer Olympics were held, and checking that every one of them can be divided by four. With 28 total Summer Olympics as of 2016, this is a proof by exhaustion with 28 cases. 

In addition to being less elegant, the proof by exhaustion will also require an extra case each time a new Summer Olympics is held. This is to be contrasted with the proof by mathematical induction, which proves the statement indefinitely into the future.

Number of cases
There is no upper limit to the number of cases allowed in a proof by exhaustion. Sometimes there are only two or three cases. Sometimes there may be thousands or even millions. For example, rigorously solving a chess endgame puzzle might involve considering a very large number of possible positions in the game tree of that problem.

The first proof of the four colour theorem was a proof by exhaustion with 1834 cases. This proof was controversial because the majority of the cases were checked by a computer program, not by hand. The shortest known proof of the four colour theorem today still has over 600 cases.

In general the probability of an error in the whole proof increases with the number of cases. A proof with a large number of cases leaves an impression that the theorem is only true by coincidence, and not because of some underlying principle or connection. Other types of proofs—such as proof by induction (mathematical induction)—are considered more elegant. However, there are some important theorems for which no other method of proof has been found, such as
 The proof that there is no finite projective plane of order 10.
 The classification of finite simple groups.
 The Kepler conjecture.
 The Boolean Pythagorean triples problem.

See also 
 British Museum algorithm
 Computer-assisted proof
 Enumerative induction
 Mathematical induction
 Proof by contradiction

Notes

Mathematical proofs
Methods of proof
Problem solving methods

de:Beweis (Mathematik)#Vollständige Fallunterscheidung